Cathyalia is a genus of snout moths. It was erected by Émile Louis Ragonot in 1888.

Species
 Cathyalia edidiehlia Roesler & Küppers, 1981 (Sumatra)
 Cathyalia fulvella Ragonot, 1888 (India, Sri Lanka, Birma, Australia)
 Cathyalia gisela Roesler & Küppers, 1981 (Sumatra)
 Cathyalia nishizawai Yamanaka, 2004
 Cathyalia okinawana Yamanaka, 2003
 Cathyalia pallicostalis Roesler & Küppers, 1981 (Sumatra)
 Cathyalia pulchrotinctella Leraut, 2019 (Madagascar)

References

 Roesler & Küppers, 1981. Die Phycitinae (Lepidoptera: Pyralidae) von Sumatra; Taxonomie Teil B, Ökologie und Geobiologie. - Beitr. naturk. Forsch. SüdwDtl. Beih. 4: 1-282.

Phycitini
Pyralidae genera
Taxa named by Émile Louis Ragonot